John H. Reading (November 26, 1917 – February 7, 2003) was a businessman and politician based in Oakland, California. He was elected as the 44th Mayor of Oakland, California and served three four-year terms, from 1966 to 1977. Since his terms, voters have consistently elected Democratic candidates as mayor of the city.

Life and career
Born in Glendale, Arizona, Reading moved as a youth with his family to Oakland. There he attended public schools. He graduated from the University of California, Berkeley in 1940, after having worked his way through college.

During World War II, Reading served in the Army Air Force as both a pilot and flight training officer. He attained the rank of Lieutenant Colonel.

After the war, Reading inherited his father's business, Ingram's Food Products. The company was based in East Oakland, and was famous for frozen Red's Tamales. He was appointed to the Oakland City Council in 1961 and served on the body until being appointed as mayor.

In 1968 Charlie Finley moved the Athletics baseball team from Kansas City to Oakland during Mayor Reading's tenure. The Oakland Athletics won three World Series while Reading was mayor. He was instrumental in gaining funding and supporting construction of the new Oakland Coliseum and expansion of the Oakland International Airport.

Reading was a Republican in a city that was becoming increasingly Democratic as the population became minority-majority. He is the last Republican to have been elected as mayor there.

Reading was elected three times: in 1967 to the position of mayor by appointment on an unexpired term, in 1969 for his first full four-year term. In 1973, Reading was forced into a run-off election by Democrat Bobby Seale, co-founder of the Black Panther Party. Reading won re-election easily.

Reading returned to his business after serving as mayor. He lived with his family in the Oak Knoll District of Oakland. Reading died in 2003 in Indian Wells, California.

References 

1917 births
2003 deaths
Mayors of Oakland, California
20th-century American politicians
University of California, Berkeley alumni